Ampelomyia is a genus of gall midges in the tribe Asphondyliini. It consists of the following four species, all of which form galls on grape plants:

 A. conicocoricis 
 A. viticola 
 A. vitiscoryloides 
 A. vitispomum

References

Cecidomyiinae
Cecidomyiidae genera

Insects described in 2019
Taxa named by Ayman Khamis Elsayed
Taxa named by Makoto Tokuda
Gall-inducing insects